Jackson Township is one of the twenty townships of Darke County, Ohio, United States. The 2010 census found 2,876 people in the township, 1,210 of whom lived in the unincorporated portions of the township.

Geography
Located in the northwestern part of the county, it borders the following townships:
Mississinawa Township - north
Allen Township - northeast
Brown Township - east
Greenville Township - southeast corner
Washington Township - south
Wayne Township, Randolph County, Indiana - southwest
Jackson Township, Randolph County, Indiana - northwest

The village of Union City is located in western Jackson Township, along the Indiana border.

Name and history
It is one of thirty-seven Jackson Townships statewide.

Jackson Township was split from Washington Township in 1833 but reduced by the creation of Gibson Township (now a part of Mercer County) in 1836.  Ten families who arrived in the area in 1829 were the first settlers within the modern boundaries of the township.

Government
The township is governed by a three-member board of trustees, who are elected in November of odd-numbered years to a four-year term beginning on the following January 1. Two are elected in the year after the presidential election and one is elected in the year before it. There is also an elected township fiscal officer, who serves a four-year term beginning on April 1 of the year after the election, which is held in November of the year before the presidential election. Vacancies in the fiscal officership or on the board of trustees are filled by the remaining trustees.  The current trustees are Richard Brooks, James Hanes, and Douglas Longfellow, and the clerk is Sandy Denniston.

References

External links
County website

Townships in Darke County, Ohio
Townships in Ohio